JGN may refer to:
 Jacobus Gideon Nel Strauss (1900–1990)
 Jiayuguan Airport, in Gansu Province, China